Marius Sasu (born 1 October 1975) is a retired Romanian professional footballer.

Career
Playing as striker, he spent most of his early career with FC Politehnica Timișoara in Liga I. In 1997–98 he had a spell with FK Vojvodina in FR Yugoslavia. In 2001, after a short spell with FC Rapid București, he moved to Hungary where he will play until 2005 with Budapest Honvéd and Ferencváros. In 2005–06 he played one season with Panserraikos in Greek second league.

Honours
Ferencváros
Nemzeti Bajnokság I: 2003–04
Magyar Kupa: 2003–04

References

Living people
1975 births
People from Mediaș
Romanian footballers
Romanian expatriate footballers
FC Politehnica Timișoara players
FC Rapid București players
FK Vojvodina players
CSM Reșița players
Expatriate footballers in Serbia and Montenegro
Expatriate footballers in Hungary
Budapest Honvéd FC players
Romanian expatriate sportspeople in Hungary
Ferencvárosi TC footballers
Expatriate footballers in Greece
Panserraikos F.C. players
Nemzeti Bajnokság I players
Association football forwards
Romanian expatriate sportspeople in Serbia and Montenegro
Romanian expatriate sportspeople in Greece